The Chesapeake and Potomac Telephone Company Warehouse and Repair Facility is an Art Deco industrial building, located at 1111 North Capitol Street, Northeast, Washington, D.C., in the NoMa neighborhood which houses the headquarters of National Public Radio.

History
It was built in 1927.
It housed C & P Telephone Company’s fleet of repair trucks, and telephone overhaul shop. 
 
It was listed on the National Register of Historic Places, in 2006.
It was leased with an option to purchase, by the Smithsonian Institution. It was redeveloped with new construction as the fourth headquarters building of National Public Radio, which opened in April 2013. A new office tower of 10 to 12 stories was built behind the historic façade.

See also
National Register of Historic Places listings in Washington, D.C.
Chesapeake and Potomac Telephone Company Building
Chesapeake and Potomac Telephone Company, Old Main Building

References

External links

NPR to Start Work on New NoMa HQ
Library Home Page — Georgetown Law
DOJ and NPR Are Coming to NoMa!

Industrial buildings and structures on the National Register of Historic Places in Washington, D.C.
Industrial buildings completed in 1927
NPR
Art Deco architecture in Washington, D.C.
Bell System
Telecommunications buildings on the National Register of Historic Places